Friedrich Alexander Graf von der Pahlen (Fyodor Petrovich Palen; September 2, 1780 in Mitau – January 8, 1863 in Saint Petersburg) was a Baltic German diplomat and administrator.

Biography
Friedrich was the youngest son of Peter Ludwig von der Pahlen, a prominent Russian courtier. He worked at Russian diplomatic missions in Sweden, France and Great Britain. In 1809–1811 he was Imperial Russia's Ambassador to the United States, in 1811–1815 he was the Ambassador to Brazil and in 1815–1822 he was the Ambassador to Bavaria.

Later, he became the General-Governor of Novorossiya and the namestnik (deputy) of Bessarabia (following the departure of Mikhail Semyonovich Vorontsov to the Caucasus). He was also a member of the State Council of Imperial Russia. In the context of the Russo-Turkish War of 1828–1829, Pahlen served as governor of the Danubian Principalities, which were administered by Russia pending the payment of war reparations by the Ottoman Empire (his official title was that of Plenipotentiary President of the Divans in Moldavia and Wallachia); he was replaced by Pyotr Zheltukhin on February 2, 1829.

In Jewish history, Pahlen is credited with opening of the first secular Jewish school in Odessa.

Notes

References
 Genealogia.ee, bio
 Alexpolenov.chat.ru, Genealogy of Pahlens
 Pahlens on wikiZnanie.ru
Constantin C. Giurescu, Istoria Bucureștilor. Din cele mai vechi timpuri pînă în zilele noastre, Ed. Pentru Literatură, Bucharest, 1966

1780 births
1863 deaths
People from Jelgava
People from the Duchy of Courland and Semigallia
Baltic-German people
Politicians of the Russian Empire
Rulers of Moldavia
Regents and governors of Wallachia
Diplomats of the Russian Empire
Ambassadors of the Russian Empire to Bavaria
Ambassadors of the Russian Empire to the United States
Ambassadors of the Russian Empire to Brazil
Fyodor
Mayors of Odesa